Jake Harders is an English actor.

Career
Jake Harders has worked in film, TV, radio and theatre. He trained at the Central School of Speech and Drama in London and he also taught there. His agent is Waring and McKenna.

He has worked in the UK in the West End, the Chichester Festival and Shakespeare's Globe, in the USA, Iceland, Europe and Russia with Cheek by Jowl, in Australia with Headlong, and in Poland with Song of the Goat Theatre. 

He received a Commendation at the UK Ian Charleson Awards 2004 for his performance in Candida, and was nominated for the international Rolex Mentor and Protégé Arts Initiative Award 2008 after working with Cheek by Jowl.

He has frequently acknowledged that his main influence is the work of Polish theatre researcher Jerzy Grotowski. He studied with actors from Grotowski's Teatr Laboratorium, from the companies of Peter Brook, Complicite, Gardzienice, The Workcentre of Jerzy Grotowski and Thomas Richards, Odin Teatret, Teatr Pieśń Kozła, and at the Grotowski Institute. He participated in work exchanges with al-Khayal al-Shaabi, Egypt and the Aboriginal Theatre Course at WAAPA, Australia.

Recent credits

Theatre
 Beasts and Beauties - Narrator (Hampstead Theatre, 2011–12, dir. Melly Still)
 Agamemnon - Agamemnon (Cambridge Greek Play, 2010, dir. Helen Eastman, website)
 The Crucible - Reverend Parris (Teatr Pieśń Kozła/Teatr Studio, Poland, 2010, dir. Grzegorz Bral)
 The Hypochondriac - Cléante (Liverpool Playhouse/English Touring Theatre, 2009, dir. Gemma Bodinetz, Playhouse site, ETT site)
 Six Characters in Search of an Author - 'Rupert Goold' and The Cameraman (Headlong at Minerva Theatre, Chichester and Gielgud Theatre, West End, 2008, dir. Rupert Goold, Chichester site, West End site ; Sydney Festival and Perth Festival, Australia, 2010, Sydney site, Perth site)
 Cymbeline - Cornelius (Cheek by Jowl, 2006-7, dir. Declan Donnellan, site)
 The Comedy of Errors - Balthasar (Shakespeare's Globe, 2006, dir. Christopher Luscombe, site)
 Titus Andronicus - Mutius (Shakespeare's Globe, 2006, dir. Lucy Bailey, site)
 Journey's End - Hibbert (New Ambassadors Theatre, West End, 2005-6, dir. David Grindley and Tim Roseman, site)
 Professor Bernhardi - Father Reder (Oxford Stage Company, 2005, dir. Mark Rosenblatt, site)
 Candida - Lexy Mill (Oxford Stage Company, 2004, dir. Christopher Luscombe)

Film
 Bel Ami - Journalist (2011, Redwave Films, dir. Declan Donnellan)

Television
 I Shouldn't Be Alive - Ken (Animal Planet, 2011, dir. Christopher Spencer)
 Peep Show - Conrad (C4, 2010, dir. Becky Martin)
 Wannabes pilot - Stefan (BBC, 2005, dir. Tim Usborne)
 Beethoven - Legrand (BBC, 2005, dir. Damon Thomas)
 Foyle's War - Jacques (ITV, 2004, dir. Gavin Millar)

Radio
 The Picture Man by David Eldridge - Feliks (BBC, 2007, dir. Sally Avens)

External links 

 Waring and McKenna

References

Alumni of the Royal Central School of Speech and Drama
English male stage actors
English male television actors
English male radio actors
English male film actors
English male Shakespearean actors
Living people
People from Heswall
Year of birth missing (living people)